Sehba Sarwar is the author of Black Wings (2004).

Biography
She grew up in  Karachi, Pakistan and has published essays, poems and short stories in newspapers and magazines in India, Pakistan, the US and Canada. She also produces experimental videos and art installations. 

Sarwar  received her B.A. in English from Mount Holyoke College in 1986, and a graduate degree from the University of Texas, Austin in Public Affairs. She has worked as a journalist in Pakistan and as an educator in Houston before founding Voices Breaking Boundaries in 2000.

Works 
 "Recovering My Voice". GOOD, Livable Houston Magazine, 2000.
 Black Wings Alhamra Publishing, 2004
 "Karachi's Winter Days." New York Times, 2008.
 "Devouring Mangoes With Gusto." Dawn, 2011.
 "Bangladesh’s Unresolved History of Independence." Creative Time Reports, 2013.
 "Lives: A Delicate Matter in the Examination Room." New York Times, 2016.
 On Belonging. Menil Collection, 2018.
 "On Belonging & Other Poems." Desi Writers Lounge, 2019.
 Black Wings - second edition. Veliz Books (2019),

References
 Karkabi, Barbara. "Crossing the Cultural Chasm". Houston Chronicle, 2003.
 "Poignant Pen". Newsline. December 2004.
 "Interview: Sehba Sarwar". Newsline, April 2011.
 Yusof, Ilona. "I let the writing guide me." The News on Sunday, October 2011.
 Rudick, Tyler. Living Room Art. Culture Map. November 5, 2011.
 Shah, Bina. "Sehba Sarwar: A Voice That Breaks Boundaries". Sampsonia Way, October 2014.
 White, Andrea. "Crossing Borders With Art". Houston Chronicle, November 2014.
 Weston, Charisse.“Meaning and Memory: Sehba Sarwar Explores Home".”  Arts and Culture Texas, 16 March, 2015.
 The Ms. "Q&A: What Intergenerational Storytelling Means to Sehba Sarwar." Ms. Magazine, July 2019.
 Gomez, Manuela. "From Karachi to Houston on the Black Wings of Secrets." India Currents, November 2019. Retrieved 2021-10-13.
 Cheby, Lisa. "Review: Black Wings by Sehba Sarwar." Entropy Magazine'', April 2021. Retrieved 2021-4-30.

External links
 Official site
 SAWNET biography
 Voices Breaking Boundaries
• Blog

Pakistani women writers
Mount Holyoke College alumni
Lyndon B. Johnson School of Public Affairs alumni
Year of birth missing (living people)
Living people